Chengdu Foreign Languages School, founded in 1989 with the approval of the Education Department of Sichuan Province and sponsored by Sichuan DeRui Development Company Ltd, is the first middle school to concentrate on foreign language learning. CDFLS ranks among the top schools locally and nationally. It is one of 16 foreign languages schools approved by the State Education Ministry to recommend students to be exempt from the Chinese National College Entrance Examination (Gao Kao).

Education
Chengdu Foreign Language School employs the standard education system of Sichuan Province in disciplines other than foreign languages. Students must choose English as one foreign language, and there are two special classes each grade: one for high-level English and the other for German, French, and Japanese (each student can only choose one). Enrollments of minor languages are controlled to be around 20 students for each language, and the admission scoreline in the interview very correspondingly.

Foreign Languages
Comparing with other middle schools, numbers of language lessons rise to nine classes per week, including one class given by foreign teachers for almost every grade. Language courses in CDFLS are smaller in class size than other courses, with only 20-30 students; small-size classrooms are also specially designed for such a class model. For English courses, junior high school students use special textbooks instead of standard textbooks in China, while students in senior high school use New Concept English 3.

International Program
School also holds various international programs. In the AP center, students can start taking AP classes in grade 10th and graduated with a recognized high school diploma. In the Sino-Canadian Program, students can earn a dual degree of both Chinese and Canadian high school diplomas. In Virscend Education Center, students can learn AP courses.

Student life

Clubs
CDFLS offers over 70 student clubs, teams, and organizations that focus on art, community action, culture, environment, politics, music, dance, journalism, and more. And there is a club fair per semester.

Campus Culture
There are several festivals every year: Foreign Language festival, Science and Technology Festival, Art Festival, PE festival, and Chinese Language Festival.

Campus
The school is on a  campus in Chengdu, Sichuan, China. It also has its residential area which can contain 4600 students and a cafe which is capable to contain 5000 students. The Chinese Garden, which is a classic-Chinese garden, contains a small river, long benches, a rockery, etc. Students always go there for relaxation.

Notable alumni
Ou Peng (Simplified Chinese: 欧鹏), The first Chinese student entered in American Congress
Zhang Junyu (Simplified Chinese: 张君钰), Actor, acted “Jia Baoyu’’ in the play “Hong Lou Meng’’

References

External links
Further description on the school's official website

Education in Chengdu
Schools in Sichuan